This list is complete and up-to-date as of December 31, 2014.
The following is a list of players, both past and current, who appeared at least in one game for the Pittsburgh Pirates National League franchise (1891–present), previously known as the Pittsburgh Alleghenys (1882–1890).



Players in Bold are members of the National Baseball Hall of Fame.

Players in Italics have had their numbers retired by the team.

A

Ed Abbaticchio
Cal Abrams
Bill Abstein
Ed Acosta
Babe Adams
Sparky Adams
Spencer Adams
Bob Addis
Gus Alberts
Ed Albosta
Vic Aldridge
Gary Alexander
Matt Alexander
Jermaine Allensworth
Gene Alley
Gair Allie
Bill Almon
Matty Alou
Moisés Alou
Jesse Altenburg
Pedro Álvarez
Tony Álvarez
Alfredo Amézaga
Alf Anderson
Dave Anderson
Goat Anderson
Jimmy Anderson
Jimmy Archer
Tony Armas
Tony Armas Jr.
Bronson Arroyo
Luis Arroyo
Harry Arundel
José Ascanio
Toby Atwell
Rich Aude
Dave Augustine
Bruce Aven
John Axford

B

Wally Backman
Jim Bagby Jr.
Jim Bagby, Sr.
Ed Bahr
Bob Bailey
Doug Bair
Doug Baird
Bill Baker
Gene Baker
Kirtley Baker
Norm Baker
Mark Baldwin
Jeff Ballard
Jeff Banister
Rod Barajas
Walter Barbare
Jap Barbeau
Dave Barbee
Andy Barkett
Sam Barkley
Clint Barmes
Eppie Barnes
Ed Barney
Clyde Barnhart
Vic Barnhart
Dick Barone
Bob Barr
Frank Barrett
Johnny Barrett
Dick Bartell
Jimmy Barthmaier
Les Bartholomew
Tony Bartirome
Monty Basgall
Eddie Basinski
Brian Bass
Miguel Batista
Bill Batsch
Joe Battin
Russ Bauers
Ross Baumgarten
Denny Bautista
José Bautista
Jason Bay
Jonah Bayliss
Bob Beall
Alex Beam
T. J. Beam
Trey Beamon
Ted Beard
Ginger Beaumont
Boom-Boom Beck
Frank Beck
Beals Becker
Jake Beckley
Érik Bédard
Andy Bednar
Ed Beecher
Hank Behrman
Joe Beimel
Stan Belinda
Bo Belinsky
Bill Bell
Derek Bell
Fern Bell
Gus Bell
Jay Bell
Josh Bell
Rafael Belliard
Mike Benjamin
Fred Bennett
Kris Benson
John Beradino
Clarence Berger
Tun Berger
Carlos Bernier
Dale Berra
Ray Berres
Kurt Bevacqua
Jim Bibby
Mike Bielecki
Lou Bierbauer
Steve Bieser
Carson Bigbee
Lyle Bigbee
Dann Bilardello
Ralph Birkofer
Bill Bishop
Rivington Bisland
Brian Bixler
Vic Black
Earl Blackburn
Ron Blackburn
Fred Blackwell
Sheriff Blake
Homer Blankenship
Cy Blanton
Joe Blanton
Steve Blass
Wes Blogg
Jimmy Bloodworth
Bert Blyleven
Eddie Bockman
Tony Boeckel
George Boehler
Brian Boehringer
Joe Boever
Pat Bohen
Barry Bonds
Tiny Bonham
Bobby Bonilla
Everett Booe
Al Bool
Lute Boone
Chris Bootcheck
Frank Bork
Hank Borowy
Don Bosch
Frank Bowerman
John Bowker
Joe Bowman
Roger Bowman
Sumner Bowman
Jason Boyd
Doe Boyland
Eddie Boyle
King Brady
Dave Brain
Erv Brame
Ron Brand
Chick Brandom
Bill Brandt
Ed Brandt
Kitty Bransfield
Sid Bream
Sam Brenegan
Bill Brenzel
Ken Brett
Fred Brickell
Bunny Brief
Harry Bright
Nelson Briles
Chuck Brinkman
Gil Britton
Steve Brodie
Frank Brooks
Frank Brosseau
Tony Brottem
Adrian Brown
Brant Brown
Dusty Brown
Emil Brown
Jimmy Brown
Mace Brown
Mike Brown
Myrl Brown
Tom Brown
Earl Browne
Pete Browning
Bill Brubaker
Jacob Brumfield
George Brunet
Steve Brye
John Buck
Steve Buechele
Scott Bullett
Bryan Bullington
Jim Bunning
Smoky Burgess
Eddie Burke
Jimmy Burke
A. J. Burnett
Sean Burnett
Jeromy Burnitz
Tom Burns
Brian Burres
Bill Burwell
Bullet Joe Bush
Guy Bush
Max Butcher
Art Butler
Tom Butters
Marlon Byrd
Bobby Byrne

C

Ernie Camacho
Fred Cambria
Hank Camelli
Arquimedes Caminero
Harry Camnitz
Howie Camnitz
Kid Camp
Jim Campanis
Marc Campbell
Vin Campbell
John Candelaria
John Cangelosi
Chris Cannizzaro
Matt Capps
Ralph Capron
Bernie Carbo
Don Cardwell
Max Carey
Bobby Cargo
Fred Carisch
Don Carlsen
Hal Carlson
Paul Carpenter
Frank Carpin
Lew Carr
D. J. Carrasco
Clay Carroll
Cliff Carroll
Fred Carroll
Steve Carter
Charlie Case
Hugh Casey
Sean Casey
Dave Cash
Harry Cassady
Jack Cassini
Pete Castiglione
José Castillo
Howdy Caton
Ronny Cedeño
Francisco Cervelli
Shawn Chacón
Leon Chagnon
Cliff Chambers
Jesse Chavez
Raúl Chávez
Tom Cheney
Jack Chesbro
Bob Chesnes
Jason Christiansen
Joe Christopher
Ryan Church
Chuck Churn
Gino Cimoli
Pedro Ciriaco
Anthony Claggett
Bill Clancy
Dave Clark
Willie Clark
Fred Clarke
Nig Clarke
Stu Clarke
Bill Clemensen
Fred Clement
Jeff Clement
Roberto Clemente
Pat Clements
Donn Clendenon
Elmer Cleveland
Gene Clines
Billy Clingman
Brad Clontz
Otis Clymer
Tom Colcolough
Alex Cole
Dick Cole
Gerrit Cole
King Cole
Victor Cole
Bob Coleman
Joe Coleman
John Coleman
Darnell Coles
Billy Colgan
Lou Collier
Ripper Collins
Zip Collins
Frank Colman
Dick Colpaert
Adam Comorosky
Pete Compton
Ralph Comstock
Onix Concepción
Dick Conger
Wid Conroy
José Contreras
Pete Conway
Joe Conzelman
Dale Coogan
Steve Cooke
Duff Cooley
Walker Cooper
Wilbur Cooper
John Corcoran
Wil Cordero
Francisco Córdova
Mark Corey
Pop Corkhill
Kevin Correia
Pete Coscarart
Dan Costello
Humberto Cota
Ensign Cottrell
Billy Cox
Danny Cox
Del Crandall
Sam Crane
George Creamer
Morrie Critchley
Fred Crolius
Jack Cronin
Joe Cronin
Bobby Crosby
Monte Cross
Michael Crotta
Iván Cruz
Juan Cruz
Luis Cruz
Víctor Cruz
Cookie Cuccurullo
Bud Culloton
Midre Cummings
Brandon Cumpton
Gene Curtis
Harvey Cushman
George Cutshaw
Kiki Cuyler
Mike Cvengros

D

Babe Dahlgren
Bruce Dal Canton
Abner Dalrymple
Jeff D'Amico
Bennie Daniels
Pete Daniels
Chase d'Arnaud
Danny Darwin
Harry Daubert
Vic Davalillo
David Davidson
Brandy Davis
Butch Davis
Dick Davis
Harry Davis
Ike Davis
J. J. Davis
Jason Davis
Lefty Davis
Rajai Davis
Ron Davis
Spud Davis
Trench Davis
Joe Dawson
Bill Day
Adam DeBus
Yurendell DeCaster
Harry Decker
Jaff Decker
Jim Dee
Bobby Del Greco
Tom Delahanty
José DeLeón
Larry Demery
Gene DeMontreville
Con Dempsey
Elmer Dessens
Orestes Destrade
Tom Dettore
Mark Dewey
Matt Diaz
Mike Diaz
Argenis Díaz
Robinzon Díaz
Buttercup Dickerson
Johnny Dickshot
Murry Dickson
Ernie Diehl
Dutch Dietz
Bob Dillinger
Pop Dillon
Miguel Diloné
Vince DiMaggio
Benny Distefano
Ona Dodd
Ed Doheny
Cozy Dolan
Jerry Don Gleaton
Jiggs Donahue
Mike Donlin
Brendan Donnelly
Jim Donnelly
Lino Donoso
Patsy Donovan
Jerry Dorsey
Octavio Dotel
Jim Dougherty
Whammy Douglas
Ryan Doumit
Kip Dowd
Conny Doyle
Doug Drabek
Denny Driscoll
Tim Drummond
Clise Dudley
Bernie Duffy
Chris Duffy
Gus Dugas
Bill Duggleby
Zach Duke
Phil Dumatrait
Pat Duncan
Fred Dunlap
Jim Dunn
Mike Dunne
Andy Dunning
Shawon Dunston
Blaine Durbin
Erv Dusak
Jerry Dybzinski
Duffy Dyer
Mike Dyer

E

Bill Eagan
Truck Eagan
Billy Earle
Mike Easler
Logan Easley
Jack Easton
Eddie Eayrs
Charlie Eden
Stump Edington
Mike Edwards (2B)
Mike Edwards (3B)
Red Ehret
Brad Eldred
Roy Ellam
Larry Elliot
Bob Elliott
Dock Ellis
Kevin Elster
Bones Ely
Angelo Encarnación
Charlie Engle
Jewel Ens
Aubrey Epps
John Ericks
Ralph Erickson
Duke Esper
Cecil Espy
Bill Evans
Dana Eveland

F

Jay Faatz
Roy Face
Héctor Fajardo
Cy Falkenberg
Pete Falsey
Stan Fansler
Bill Farmer
Jack Farmer
Kyle Farnsworth
Duke Farrell
Bob Ferguson
Félix Fermín
Ed Fernandes
Nanny Fernandez
Jack Ferry
Mike Fetters
Jim Field
Jocko Fields
Luis Figueroa
Nelson Figueroa
Hal Finney
William Fischer
Brian Fisher
Harry Fisher
Wilbur Fisher
Ed Fitz Gerald
Ira Flagstead
Patsy Flaherty
Steamer Flanagan
Les Fleming
Elbie Fletcher
Don Flinn
Pedro Florimón
John Flynn
Josh Fogg
Lee Fohl
Hank Foiles
Tom Foley
Tim Foli
Dee Fondy
Jim Foor
Brownie Foreman
Terry Forster
Tom Forster
Larry Foss
George Fox
John Fox
Earl Francis
Gene Freese
George Freese
Jim Fregosi
Larry French
Bob Friend
Ernesto Frieri
Doug Frobel
Sam Frock
Eric Fryer
Woodie Fryman
J. J. Furmaniak
Fred Fussell

G

Ken Gables
Sean Gallagher
Pud Galvin
Bob Ganley
Gussie Gannon
John Ganzel
Joe Garagiola, Sr.
Bob Garber
Gene Garber
Mike Garcia
Carlos García
Freddy García
Miguel García
Harry Gardner
Jim Gardner
Bill Garfield
Debs Garms
Phil Garner
Cito Gaston
Hank Gastright
Huck Geary
Johnny Gee
John Gelnar
Frank Genins
Wally Gerber
Al Gerheauser
Lou Gertenrich
Jody Gerut
Gus Getz
Joe Gibbon
George Gibson
Kirk Gibson
Robert Gibson
Brett Gideon
Paul Giel
Jack Gilbert
John Gilbert
Brett Giles
Brian Giles
Warren Gill
Sam Gillen
Len Gilmore
Al Gionfriddo
Dave Giusti
Jack Glasscock
Whitey Glazner
Billy Gleason
Ed Glenn
Jot Goar
Jerry Goff
Chuck Goggin
Chris Gomez
Jeanmar Gómez
Jesse Gonder
Mike Gonzalez
Denny González
Fernando González
José González
Johnny Gooch
Jake Goodman
Sid Gordon
Jack Gorman
Hank Gornicki
Tom Gorzelanny
Howie Goss
Rich Gossage
Julio Gotay
Jim Gott
John Grabow
Earl Grace
Jeff Granger
George Grant
Mudcat Grant
George Grantham
Bill Gray
Charlie Gray
Chummy Gray
Jim Gray
Stan Gray
Chris Green
Fred Green
Hank Greenberg
Hal Gregg
Tommy Gregg
Reddy Grey
Tom Griffin
Jason Grilli
Burleigh Grimes
Charlie Grimm
Dick Groat
Heinie Groh
Howdy Groskloss
Don Gross
Al Grunwald
Cecilio Guante
Deolis Guerra
José Guillén
Ben Guintini
Ad Gumbert
Billy Gumbert
Harry Gumbert
Frankie Gustine
Don Gutteridge

H

Yamid Haad
Mule Haas
Eric Hacker
Harvey Haddix
Bill Haeffner
Bud Hafey
Matt Hague
Jerry Hairston, Sr.
Albert Hall
Bill Hall
Bob Hall
Dick Hall
Jack Hallett
Newt Halliday
Bill Hallman
Dave Hamilton
Earl Hamilton
Ken Hamlin
Luke Hamlin
Jack Hammond
Lee Hancock
Jim Handiboe
Lee Handley
Ned Hanlon
Joel Hanrahan
Greg Hansell
Craig Hansen
J. A. Happ
Gary Hargis
Charlie Hargreaves
Bob Harmon
Brian Harper
Terry Harper
Ray Harrell
Bill Harris
Joe Harris
Josh Harrison
Bill Hart
Corey Hart
Kevin Hart
Chuck Hartenstein
Fred Hartman
Andy Hassler
Charlie Hastings
Billy Hatcher
Charlie Hautz
Pink Hawley
Charlie Hayes
Jackie Hayes
Fred Hayner
Charlie Heard
Neal Heaton
Wally Hebert
Richie Hebner
Guy Hecker
Ken Heintzelman
Tommy Helms
Ducky Hemp
Rollie Hemsley
Hardie Henderson
George Hendrick
Claude Hendrix
Gail Henley
Bill Henry
Babe Herman
Billy Herman
Chad Hermansen
Gene Hermanski
Alex Hernández
Gorkys Hernández
Jackie Hernández
José Hernández
Ramón Hernández
Roberto Hernández
Yoslan Herrera
Art Herring
Johnny Hetki
Jake Hewitt
Kirby Higbe
Bobby Hill
Carmen Hill
Homer Hillebrand
Chuck Hiller
Mack Hillis
Bill Hinchman
Paul Hines
Eric Hinske
Chan Ho Park
Don Hoak
Bill Hoffer
Jesse Hoffmeister
John Hofford
Solly Hofman
Cal Hogue
John Holdzkom
Al Holland
Ed Holley
Bonnie Hollingsworth
Brock Holt
Wally Hood
John Hope
Mike Hopkins
Johnny Hopp
Jim Hopper
Elmer Horton
Dave Hostetler
J. R. House
Del Howard
Lee Howard
Art Howe
Dixie Howell
Bill Howerton
Waite Hoyt
Bill Hughes
Jared Hughes
Jim Hughey
Mark Huismann
Brian Hunter
Newt Hunter
Bert Husting
Ham Hyatt
Adam Hyzdu

I

Brandon Inge
Mel Ingram
Phil Irwin
Travis Ishikawa
Akinori Iwamura
César Izturis

J

Al Jackson
Charlie Jackson
Danny Jackson
Grant Jackson
Steven Jackson
Elmer Jacobs
Spook Jacobs
Chris Jakubauskas
Vic Janowicz
Jason Jaramillo
Roy Jarvis
Jesse Jefferson
Woody Jensen
Johnny Jeter
Sam Jethroe
Houston Jiménez
Juan Jiménez
Manny Jiménez
Bob Johnson
Dave Johnson
Jason Johnson
Kris Johnson
Lloyd Johnson
Mark Johnson
Doc Johnston
Joel Johnston
Mike Johnston
Rex Johnston
Alex Jones
Barry Jones
Cobe Jones
Garrett Jones
Henry Jones
Odell Jones
Percy Jones
Tim Jones
Bubber Jonnard
Harry Jordan
Mike Jordan
Walt Judnich
Red Juelich
Ken Jungels

K

Jack Kading
Jake Kafora
Frank Kalin
Jim Kane
Jung-ho Kang
Erv Kantlehner
Ed Karger
Jeff Karstens
Matt Kata
Bill Keen
Jim Keenan
Mickey Keliher
Joe Kelley
Billy Kelly
Don Kelly
George Kelly
Herb Kelly
Jim Kelly
Joe Kelly
Billy Kelsey
John Kelty
Rudy Kemmler
Steve Kemp
Jason Kendall
Brickyard Kennedy
Sam Khalifa
Pat Kilhullen
Frank Killen
Ralph Kiner
Jeff King
Lee King
Nellie King
Silver King
Mike Kingery
Ed Kinsella
Tom Kinslow
Bob Kipper
Ed Kirkpatrick
Bruce Kison
Chuck Klein
Ron Kline
Bob Klinger
Ted Kluszewski
Clyde Kluttz
Otto Knabe
Phil Knell
Jimmy Knowles
Cliff Knox
Nick Koback
Dan Kolb
Gary Kolb
Fred Kommers
Ed Konetchy
Dennis Konuszewski
George Kopacz
Clem Koshorek
Bill Koski
Lou Koupal
Randy Kramer
Erik Kratz
Danny Kravitz
Ray Krawczyk
Ray Kremer
Otto Krueger
Al Krumm
Bill Kuehne
Charlie Kuhns
Earl Kunz
Masumi Kuwata
Bob Kuzava

L

Clem Labine
Lee Lacy
Hi Ladd
Bobby LaFromboise
Fred Lake
Tim Laker
Dan Lally
Jack Lamabe
John Lamb
Andrew Lambo
Dennis Lamp
Dick Lanahan
Bill Landrum
Chappy Lane
Marty Lang
Rick Langford
Rimp Lanier
Johnny Lanning
Paul LaPalme
Dave LaPoint
Adam LaRoche
Andy LaRoche
Sam LaRocque
Tacks Latimer
Chuck Lauer
Cookie Lavagetto
Mike LaValliere
Vance Law
Vern Law
Sean Lawrence
Alfred Lawson
Matt Lawton
Herman Layne
Tommy Leach
Tom Leahy
Jack Leary
Wil Ledezma
Cliff Lee
Derrek Lee
Mark Lee
Watty Lee
Sam Leever
Lefty Leifield
Ed Leip
Larry LeJeune
Johnnie LeMaster
Joe Leonard
Don Leppert
Chris Leroux
Sixto Lezcano
Jon Lieber
Brad Lincoln
Mike Lincoln
José Lind
Johnny Lindell
Freddie Lindstrom
Bob Linton
Francisco Liriano
Nelson Liriano
Scott Little
Dick Littlefield
Radhames Liz
Abel Lizotte
Esteban Loaiza
Hans Lobert
Jeff Locke
Kenny Lofton
Johnny Logan
Alberto Lois
Rich Loiselle
Vic Lombardi
Steve Lombardozzi Jr.
Bob Long
Dale Long
Al López
Javier López
Mendy López
Scott Loucks
Tom Lovelace
Bobby Lowe
Sean Lowe
Red Lucas
Frank Luce
Ryan Ludwick
Del Lundgren
Al Luplow
Jerry Lynch
Mike Lynch
Al Lyons
Denny Lyons
Ed Lytle

M

Bill Macdonald
Danny MacFayden
Ken Macha
Connie Mack
Denny Mack
Rob Mackowiak
Gene Madden
Morris Madden
Nick Maddox
Mike Maddux
Art Madison
Bill Madlock
Harl Maggert
Jack Maguire
Roy Mahaffey
Mickey Mahler
Paul Maholm
Pat Mahomes
Woody Main
Carlos Maldonado
Al Mamaux
Jim Mangan
Ángel Mangual
Fred Mann
Jim Mann
Mike Mansell
Lou Manske
Heinie Manush
Josías Manzanillo
Ravelo Manzanillo
Rabbit Maranville
Lou Marone
Luis Márquez
Jim Marshall
Joe Marshall
Dámaso Marte
Starling Marte
Al Martin
Paul Martin
Russell Martin
Stu Martin
Carmelo Martínez
Javier Martínez
Joe Martinez
José Martínez
Manny Martínez
Michael Martínez
Ramón Martínez
Phil Masi
Roger Mason
Rubén Mateo
Gary Matthews Jr.
Jim Mattox
Gene Mauch
Al Maul
Dal Maxvill
Bert Maxwell
Buckshot May
Darrell May
Dave May
Jerry May
Milt May
Erskine Mayer
Bill Mazeroski
Vin Mazzaro
Lee Mazzilli
Dixie McArthur
Ike McAuley
Al McBean
George McBride
Windy McCall
Alex McCarthy
Jack McCarthy
Tom McCarthy
Pete McClanahan
Lloyd McClendon
Jim McCormick
Moose McCormick
Tom McCreery
Clyde McCullough
Jeff McCurry
Andrew McCutchen
Daniel McCutchen
James McDonald
John McDonald
Jim McDonald
Sam McDowell
Will McEnaney
Chappie McFarland
Orlando McFarlane
Casey McGehee
Frank McGinn
Irish McIlveen
Stuffy McInnis
Bill McKechnie
Jim McKee
Russ McKelvy
Michael McKenry
Alex McKinnon
Tony McKnight
Frank McLaughlin
Warren McLaughlin
Marty McLeary
Cal McLish
Nate McLouth
Jack McMahan
Tom McNamara
Jerry McNertney
Kyle McPherson
George McQuillan
Pete McShannic
Larry McWilliams
Johnny Meador
Brian Meadows
Lee Meadows
Pat Meares
Doc Medich
Scott Medvin
Pete Meegan
Evan Meek
Jouett Meekin
Dutch Meier
Heine Meine
Román Mejías
Mark Melancon
Mario Mendoza
Jock Menefee
Tony Menéndez
Ed Mensor
Orlando Merced
Jack Mercer
Jordy Mercer
Art Merewether
Bill Merritt
George Merritt
Jack Merson
José Mesa
Catfish Metkovich
Dan Miceli
Gene Michael
Jason Michaels
Doug Mientkiewicz
Pete Mikkelsen
Johnny Miljus
Lastings Milledge
Bill Miller
Bob Miller
Doggie Miller
Dots Miller
Frank Miller
Jake Miller
Paul Miller
Ray Miller
Roscoe Miller
Ward Miller
Randy Milligan
John Milner
Blas Minor
Jim Minshall
Mike Mitchell
Wilmer Mizell
Danny Moeller
Dennis Moeller
Johnny Mokan
Fritz Mollwitz
Raúl Mondesí
Craig Monroe
Willie Montañez
Felipe Montemayor
Eddie Moore
Frank Moore
Gene Moore
Bob Moose
Sam Moran
Brent Morel
Ramón Morel
Lew Moren
Omar Moreno
Bill Morgan (OF/C)
Bill Morgan (OF/SS)
Nyjer Morgan
John Morlan
Justin Morneau
Bryan Morris
Ed Morris
Matt Morris
Warren Morris
Jim Morrison
Johnny Morrison
Phil Morrison
Michael Morse
Charlie Morton
Charlie Morton
Walt Moryn
Paul Moskau
Daniel Moskos
Jim Mosolf
Brandon Moss
Manny Mota
Frank Mountain
Mike Mowrey
Ray Mueller
Walter Mueller
Joe Muir
Hugh Mulcahy
Terry Mulholland
Eddie Mulligan
Bob Muncrief
Red Munger
Eddie Murphy
Leo Murphy
Morgan Murphy
Danny Murtaugh

N

Xavier Nady
Judge Nagle
Steve Nagy
Cholly Naranjo
Pete Naton
Yamaico Navarro
Denny Neagle
Jack Neagle
Jim Nealon
Ron Necciai
Cal Neeman
Cy Neighbors
Bill Nelson
Jim Nelson
Rocky Nelson
John Newell
Sam Nicholl
Chet Nichols, Sr.
Fred Nicholson
Ovid Nicholson
George Nicol
Steve Nicosia
Al Niehaus
Randy Niemann
Bill Niles
Jayson Nix
Junior Noboa
The Only Nolan
Red Nonnenkamp
Wayne Nordhagen
Nelson Norman
Mel Novak
Abraham Núñez

O

Henry Oberbeck
Ken Oberkfell
Eddie O'Brien
John O'Brien
Johnny O'Brien
Ray O'Brien
Tom O'Brien
Tommy O'Brien
Danny O'Connell
John O'Connell
Brian O'Connor
Jack O'Connor
Paddy O'Connor
Hank O'Day
Billy O'Dell
George O'Donnell
Ross Ohlendorf
Red Oldham
Bob Oldis
Omar Olivares
Al Oliver
Bob Oliver
Joe Oliver
Diomedes Olivo
Garrett Olson
Tony Ordeñana
Joe Orsulak
Junior Ortiz
Bob Osborn
Fred Osborne
Wayne Osborne
Keith Osik
Franquelis Osoria
Fritz Ostermueller
Bill Otey
Amos Otis
Marty O'Toole
Ed Ott
Dave Otto
Lyle Overbay
Bob Owchinko

P

Dick Padden
Tom Padden
Dave Pagan
José Pagán
Joe Page
Mitchell Page
Jim Pagliaroni
Matt Pagnozzi
Vicente Palacios
Frank Papish
Mark Parent
Dave Parker
Jay Parker
José Parra
Steve Parris
Lance Parrish
Tom Parsons
Claude Passeau
Freddie Patek
Bob Patterson
Daryl Patterson
Xavier Paul
Ronny Paulino
Harley Payne
Steve Pearce
Al Pedrique
Red Peery
Steve Pegues
Heinie Peitz
Eddie Pellagrini
Alejandro Peña
Hipólito Peña
Orlando Peña
Tony Peña
Jim Pendleton
Hayden Penn
Will Pennyfeather
Laurin Pepper
George Perez
Juan Pérez
Óliver Pérez
Pascual Pérez
Chris Peters
John Peters
Pete Peterson
Mark Petkovsek
Paul Pettit
Jesse Petty
Jeff Pfeffer
Jack Pfiester
Babe Phelps
Ed Phelps
Josh Phelps
Deacon Phillippe
Bill Phillips
Eddie Phillips
Jack Phillips
Jason Phillips
Marr Phillips
Val Picinich
Félix Pie
Bill Pierro
Tony Piet
Stolmy Pimentel
Jake Pitler
Juan Pizarro
Elmo Plaskett
Dan Plesac
Ray Poat
Johnny Podgajny
Gregory Polanco
Kevin Polcovich
Howie Pollet
Elmer Ponder
Ed Poole
Paul Popovich
Bob Porterfield
Bill Powell
Ross Powell
Ted Power
John Powers
Alex Presley
Bob Priddy
Tom Prince
Buddy Pritchard
Alfonso Pulido
Bob Purkey

Q

Chad Qualls
Mel Queen
Joe Quest
Tom Quinn
Rey Quiñones

R

Marv Rackley
Drew Rader
Jack Rafter
Pep Rambert
Alex Ramírez
Aramis Ramírez
Pedro Ramos
Dick Rand
Joe Randa
Willie Randolph
Johnny Rawlings
Johnny Ray
Curt Raydon
Harry Raymond
John Raynor
Britt Reames
Jeff Reboulet
Joe Redfield
Mark Redman
Tike Redman
Gary Redus
Rick Reed
Pokey Reese
Bill Regan
Wally Rehg
Billy Reid
Ryan Reid
Arch Reilly
Charlie Reilly
Pete Reiser
Heinie Reitz
Ken Reitz
Rick Rentería
Xavier Rescigno
Chris Resop
Dino Restelli
Michael Restovich
Rick Reuschel
Jerry Reuss
Al Reyes
Dennys Reyes
Bryan Reynolds
Craig Reynolds
R. J. Reynolds
Bobby Rhawn
Billy Rhines
Rick Rhoden
Hal Rhyne
Dennis Ribant
Hal Rice
Jeff Richardson
John Richmond
Joe Rickert
Marv Rickert
Dave Ricketts
Harry Riconda
Elmer Riddle
Johnny Riddle
Culley Rikard
Ricardo Rincón
Frank Ringo
Armando Ríos
Claude Ritchey
Todd Ritchie
Jim Ritz
Luis Rivas
Carlos Rivera
Johnny Rizzo
Fred Roat
Curt Roberts
Dave Roberts (1B/OF)
Dave Roberts (P)
Willis Roberts
Bob Robertson
Dave Robertson
Rich Robertson
Bill Robinson
Don Robinson
Hank Robinson
Jeff Robinson (RP)
Jeff Robinson (SP)
Chick Robitaille
Andre Rodgers
Bill Rodgers
Josh Rodriguez
Sean Rodriguez
Rosario Rodríguez
Rubén Rodríguez
Wandy Rodríguez
Preacher Roe
Mike Roesler
Wally Roettger
Brian Rogers
Ray Rohwer
Stan Rojek
Enrique Romo
Jim Rooker
Rosie Rosebraugh
David Ross
Mark Ross
Jack Rothfuss
Phil Routcliffe
Jack Rowe
Al Rubeling
Dave Rucker
Matt Ruebel
Scott Ruskin
Jim Russell
Reb Russell
Mark Ryal
Mike Ryan

S

Casey Sadler
Ray Sadler
Jim Sadowski
Tom Saffell
Vic Saier
Marino Salas
Jeff Salazar
Freddy Sale
Ed Sales
Harry Salisbury
Bill Salkeld
Jack Saltzgaver
Jack Salveson
Roger Samuels
Duaner Sánchez
Freddy Sanchez
Gaby Sánchez
Jonathan Sánchez
Rómulo Sánchez
Tony Sanchez
Reggie Sanders
Roy Sanders
Mike Sandlock
Charlie Sands
Chance Sanford
Manny Sanguillén
Ben Sankey
Benito Santiago
Víctor Santos
Manny Sarmiento
Mackey Sasser
Scott Sauerbeck
Rich Sauveur
Ted Savage
Rob Scahill
Doc Scanlan
Bobby Schang
Fritz Scheeren
Frank Scheibeck
John Scheneberg
Hank Schenz
Jason Schmidt
Walter Schmidt
Crazy Schmit
Ducky Schofield
Otto Schomberg
Pete Schourek
Pop Schriver
Frank Schulte
Fred Schulte
Bob Schultz
Joe Schultz (C)
Joe Schultz (OF)
Jeff Schulz
Bill Schuster
Don Schwall
Jack Scott
Milt Scott
Pete Scott
Rod Scurry
Jimmy Sebring
Sonny Senerchia
Dan Serafini
Rip Sewell
Jake Seymour
Ralph Shafer
Spike Shannon
Bobby Shantz
Bud Sharpe
Josh Sharpless
Ben Shaw
Hunky Shaw
Tom Sheehan
Tommy Sheehan
Earl Sheely
Jim Shellenback
Ben Shelton
Jack Shepard
Bill Short
Brian Shouse
John Shovlin
Frank Shugart
Harry Shuman
Ed Sicking
Paddy Siglin
José Silva
Mike Simon
Randall Simon
Harry Simpson
Elmer Singleton
Tommie Sisk
Bill Skiff
Bob Skinner
Matt Skrmetta
Cy Slapnicka
Doug Slaten
Phil Slattery
Don Slaught
John Smiley
Bob Smith
Brian Smith
Bull Smith
Dick Smith
Earl Smith (OF)
Earl Smith (C)
Frank Smith
Hal Smith (C)
Hal Smith (IF)
Hal Smith (P)
Harry Smith
Heinie Smith
Jim Smith
Jimmy Smith
Jud Smith
Lonnie Smith
Mark Smith
Mike Smith
Mike Smith
Paul Smith
Phenomenal Smith
Pop Smith
Red Smith
Red Smith
Sherry Smith
Syd Smith
Vinnie Smith
Zane Smith
Frank Smykal
Ian Snell
Travis Snider
Chris Snyder
Clint Sodowsky
Luis Sojo
Eddie Solomon
Don Songer
Joakim Soria
Denny Sothern
Billy Southworth
Bill Sowders
Steve Sparks
Tully Sparks
Glenn Spencer
Roy Spencer
Ed Sprague Jr.
George Spriggs
Ed Spurney
Matt Stairs
Harry Staley
Tom Stankard
Willie Stargell
Charlie Starr
Ray Starr
Bob Steele
Elmer Steele
Gene Steere
Bill Steinecke
Ray Steineder
Casey Stengel
Rennie Stennett
Jake Stenzel
Ed Stevens
R. C. Stevens
Bud Stewart
Chris Stewart
Stuffy Stewart
Arnie Stone
Lil Stoner
Alan Storke
Doug Strange
Scott Stratton
George Strickland
George Strief
Nick Strincevich
Jim Stroner
Steamboat Struss
Bill Stuart
Dick Stuart
Tom Sturdivant
Chris Stynes
Jim Suchecki
Joe Sugden
Gus Suhr
Billy Sullivan Jr.
Dan Sullivan
Fleury Sullivan
Joe Sullivan
John Sullivan
Homer Summa
Billy Sunday
Jeff Suppan
Max Surkont
George Susce
Drew Sutton
Dale Sveum
Harry Swacina
Red Swanson
Ed Swartwood
Ed Sweeney
Hank Sweeney
Steve Swetonic
Bill Swift
Oad Swigart

T

Jeff Tabaka
José Tábata
Hisanori Takahashi
Jesse Tannehill
Jack Taschner
Al Tate
Ty Taubenheim
Walt Tauscher
Julián Tavárez
Frank Taveras
Billy Taylor (1990s)
Billy Taylor (1980s)
Carl Taylor
Dorn Taylor
Live Oak Taylor
Kent Tekulve
Gene Tenace
Walt Terrell
Adonis Terry
Zeb Terry
Tommy Thevenow
Jake Thies
Frank Thomas
Justin Thomas
Roy Thomas
Aaron Thompson
Fresco Thompson
Gus Thompson
Jason Thompson
Will Thompson
Luis Tiant
Jay Tibbs
Cotton Tierney
Jack Tising
Jim Tobin
Al Todd
Bobby Tolan
Freddie Toliver
Andy Tomberlin
Dave Tomlin
Randy Tomlin
Wyatt Toregas
Salomón Torres
Lou Tost
Pie Traynor
Chris Tremie
Joe Trimble
Fred Truax
Harry Truby
John Tudor
Lee Tunnell
Earl Turner
Terry Turner
Elmer Tutwiler

U
Jim Umbricht

V

Bob Vail
John Van Benschoten
George Van Haltren
Todd Van Poppel
Maurice Van Robays
Andy Van Slyke
Dazzy Vance
Rick VandenHurk
John Vander Wal
Eddie Vargas
Gary Varsho
Virgil Vasquez
Arky Vaughan
Ramón Vázquez
Peek-A-Boo Veach
Coot Veal
Donnie Veal
Bob Veale
Bucky Veil
Pat Veltman
José Veras
Mickey Vernon
Ron Villone
Jim Viox
Bill Virdon
Ozzie Virgil, Sr.
Joe Vitelli
Ryan Vogelsong
Edinson Vólquez
Chris Volstad

W

Charlie Wacker
Rube Waddell
Ben Wade
Bill Wagner
Honus Wagner
Paul Wagner
Dave Wainhouse
Tim Wakefield
Bob Walk
Dixie Walker
Luke Walker
Neil Walker
Jeff Wallace
Jim Wallace
Lee Walls
Connie Walsh
Junior Walsh
Bernie Walter
Reggie Walton
Lloyd Waner
Paul Waner
Chuck Ward
Daryle Ward
Piggy Ward
Preston Ward
Turner Ward
Ed Warner
Hooks Warner
Bill Warwick
Jimmy Wasdell
John Wasdin
U L Washington
Fred Waters
Mule Watson
Tony Watson
Jim Waugh
Art Weaver
Farmer Weaver
Jim Weaver
Bill Webb
Lefty Webb
Mitch Webster
John Wehner
Johnny Welch
Duke Welker
Kip Wells
Don Wengert
Bill Werle
Max West
Wally Westlake
Gus Weyhing
Rip Wheeler
Bill White
Deacon White
Kirby White
Rick White
Burgess Whitehead
Art Whitney
Ed Whitson
Possum Whitted
Dave Wickersham
Whitey Wietelmann
Ty Wigginton
Kaiser Wilhelm
Joe Wilhoit
Curtis Wilkerson
Lefty Wilkie
Marc Wilkins
Ted Wilks
Dave Williams
Don Williams
Eddie Williams
Jimmy Williams
Mike Williams
Vic Willis
Claude Willoughby
Maury Wills
Art Wilson
Bill Wilson
Chief Wilson
Craig Wilson
Enrique Wilson
Gary Wilson
Glenn Wilson
Grady Wilson
Jack Wilson
Justin Wilson
Mike Wilson
Snake Wiltse
Bill Windle
Lave Winham
Jim Winn
Roy Wise
Jack Wisner
Dave Wissman
George Witt
Ed Wolfe
Harry Wolfe
Roger Wolff
Harry Wolter
Tony Womack
Brandon Wood
Roy Wood
Spades Wood
Tim Wood
Wilbur Wood
Fred Woodcock
Gene Woodling
Walt Woods
Chuck Workman
Vance Worley
Ron Wotus
Jimmy Woulfe
Dave Wright
Glenn Wright
Joe Wright
Ren Wylie
Marvell Wynne
Johnny Wyrostek

Y

Henry Yaik
Tyler Yates
Emil Yde
George Yeager
Chief Yellow Horse
Lenny Yochim
Mike York
Shane Youman
Delwyn Young
Harley Young
Irv Young
Kevin Young
Pep Young
Henry Youngman
Eddie Yount

Z

Chris Zachary
Mike Zagurski
Frankie Zak
Jeff Zaske
George Ziegler
Chief Zimmer
Jimmy Zinn
Richie Zisk
Billy Zitzmann

External links
BR batting statistics
BR pitching statistics

Roster
Major League Baseball all-time rosters